The Josiah Cowles House is a historic house at 184 Marion Avenue, in the Plantsville section of Southington, Connecticut.  Built in the mid-18th century, it is a well-preserved local example of Georgian architecture.  It was listed on the National Register of Historic Places in 1989.  It presently houses a bed and breakfast inn.

Description and history
The Josiah Cowles House stands on the south side of Marion Avenue, between Sunny Ridge Drive and Old Mill Road west of the village center of Plantsville and Interstate 84.  It is a -story wood-frame structure, five bays wide, with a side-gable roof, central chimney, and clapboarded exterior.  Its main facade is five bays wide, with a wide double door at its center. The door is framed by simple trim, while the windows are surmounted by slightly projecting caps.

Although traditionally ascribed a construction date of 1728, the architecture suggests it was built closer to 1750, probably around the time of Josiah Cowles' second marriage.  The house was the residence of Captain Josiah Cowles, one of the early settlers of Southington. Cowles was born in Farmington, Connecticut on November 20, 1713.  He was a justice of the peace and a captain in the local militia. He held a number of town offices, and was viewed as a leading man in town. At the very first town meeting after the incorporation of Southington, held November 11, 1779,  the residents appointed Cowles, along with Jonathan Root  to a committee to "provide for the families of officers and soldiers in the field."  In 1774, Cowles was appointed to a committee to deliver provisions to Boston, in response to the British blockade of Boston harbor.

See also
National Register of Historic Places listings in Southington, Connecticut

References

Houses on the National Register of Historic Places in Connecticut
Houses completed in 1750
Houses in Southington, Connecticut
National Register of Historic Places in Hartford County, Connecticut
1750 establishments in the Thirteen Colonies